Vijay K. Kuchroo is an Indian-American immunologist and serial entrepreneur. He is the Samuel L. Wasserstrom chair of Neurology at Harvard Medical School, and Brigham and Women's Hospital. He is also the director of the Evergrande Center for Immunologic Diseases at Harvard Medical School and Brigham and Women's Hospital in Boston, Massachusetts.

Prof. Kuchroo specializes in autoimmunity, neuroscience, and cancer immunotherapy. He is best known for discovering the co-inhibitory molecule TIM-3, the TIM family of genes, and the subset of immune cells called Th17 cells. He is also a member of the Broad Institute in Cambridge, Massachusetts, and senior scientist at the Brigham and Women's Hospital.

Career
He was awarded a Ph.D. in veterinary pathology from the University of Queensland in 1985   Subsequently he was a Fogarty International Fellow at NIH for a year before becoming a research fellow at the department of pathology at Harvard Medical School. He later joined the faculty of the Center for Neurologic Diseases at Brigham and Women’s Hospital as a junior faculty member.

In 2004, Dr. Kuchroo was promoted to Professor of Neurology at Harvard Medical School and senior scientist at Brigham and Women's Hospital. In 2005, he was awarded an endowed personal chair from Biogen. He served as co-director for the Center for Infection and Immunity at the Brigham Research Institutes and Brigham and Women's Hospital. In 2014, Dr. Kuchroo founded the Evergrande Center for Immunologic Diseases and currently serves as its founding director. Evergrande Center is a joint center between Harvard Medical School and Brigham and Women's Hospital, dedicated to studying the molecular and genetic basis of tissue inflammation in multiple human diseases, including cancer and autoimmune diseases.

Kuchroo raised funding from external sources to start a teaching course in India called Winter School in Immunology in India.

Kuchroo serves or has served on the editorial boards of several peer-reviewed scientific journal, including Journal of Experimental Medicine, Journal of Immunology, Journal of Neuroimmunology, International Immunology, Cellular Immunology, Scandinavian Journal of Immunology, and Autoimmunity. He also serves or has served on the scientific review boards for Howard Hughes Medical Institute, National Multiple Sclerosis Society, Juvenile Diabetes Research Foundation, and NIH Panel of Elite Reviewers. Dr. Kuchroo is also on the board of directors and scientific advisory boards of multiple biotech and pharmaceutical companies.

Research
Kuchroo initial contribution to the field began with using genetic approaches of transgenesis to generate mouse models for human disease Multiple Sclerosis, a key tool for MS research the world over. He then discovered a novel, cell-surface molecule on T cells called TIM-3, a co-inhibitory molecule, along with the rest of the TIM family of genes. He was the first to characterize the inhibitory function of TIM-3 and its role in inhibiting T cell responses in both autoimmunity and cancer. Similar to other checkpoint inhibitors such as PD-1 and CTLA-4, TIM-3 has been successfully targeted to treat several solid and hematogenous malignancies, including melanoma, AML, and MDS.

Kuchroo was instrumental in shepherding anti-Tim-3 antibody from discovery through to clinic by working with a number of biotech and drug companies to its ultimate use by Novartis for treatment in cancer.

Kuchroo's most critical contribution to the field has come from his discovery of a novel IL-17 cytokine-producing T cell subset, Th17 cells. His was the first group to report the identity of this subset in 2005, together with other investigators in the field, followed by identification of pathways for their differentiation in 2006. The Kuchroo lab conducted extensive studies characterizing their role in autoimmune disease pathogenesis, and together with Aviv Regev at the Broad Institute, built the regulatory network for the development. Dr. Kuchroo was instrumental in promoting clinical trials of IL-17-blockade for the treatment of autoimmune diseases. He was also the first to identify a link between high salt and generation of Th17 cells, suggesting a role of high salt diets in triggering autoimmune diseases, which has now been confirmed by multiple epidemiological studies.

Kuchroo has published over 400 peer-reviewed, original articles, and one of his papers is one of the highest-cited papers in the field of Immunology. Many of his groundbreaking discoveries - most notably TIM-3 and Th17 cells - have developed into therapies for patients, with several active clinical trials based on his research and 6 pharmaceutical companies founded, based on his discoveries.

Awards
 2021 - John Dystel Prize for Multiple Sclerosis Research from National Multiple Sclerosis Society and the American Academy of Neurology
 2020 - ICIS BioLegend William E. Paul Award from International Cytokine & Interferon Society (Seattle, Washington)
 2018 - Dr. William E. Paul Distinguished Innovator Award, Lupus Research Alliance (New York, New York)
 2017 - Nobel Assembly Lecture at Karolinska Institute
 2014 - Ranbaxy Prize for Medical Research (New Delhi, India)
 2014 - Nobel Laureate Peter Doherty Lecture / Prize St. Jude's Hospital (Memphis, Tennessee)
 2002-2009 - The Javits Neuroscience Investigator Award, National Institutes of Health (Bethesda, Maryland)
 1988-1990 - Charles A. King Trust Award, The Medical Foundation (Boston, Massachusetts)
 1985 - Fogarty International Fellow, National Institutes of Health 
 1984-1985 - Fred Z. Eager Research Prize, University of Queensland

References

Authored bibliography

External links
 ORCID 0000-0001-7177-2110
 GS h6h5FdoAAAAJ
 PubMed search for Vijay K. Kuchroo

1955 births
American immunologists
Harvard Medical School faculty
Living people
University of Queensland alumni
American medical academics
American medical researchers
Indian emigrants to the United States